Eddaland administratively designated by Nigeria as Afikpo South covers an entire local government area in Ebonyi State, Nigeria.

Locations
Eddaland is composed of many autonomous communities and towns which include: Ebunwana Edda, Nguzu Edda, Ekoli Edda, Owutu Edda, Amangwu Edda, Oso Edda, Etiti Edda, Ogbu Edda etc. The local area headquarters Afikpo South, being the Nigerian government designated administrative name for Eddaland is at Nguzu.

The names of Edda towns often have Edda at their endings as an addendum designating their membership of the Edda cultural common wealth and community of shared values. Each of the autonomous communities of Eddaland had been existing as small city states with each having its own monarch before Nigeria was carved up by British colonialists. These communities made up of about 72 villages today had been functioning as a confederation of small city states bounded by common heritage until 1867. That was when British colonialists finally enveloped Eddaland into the Southern Oil Protectorate, which even later became a now defunct country of Southern Nigeria. Southern Nigeria was amalgamated with Northern Nigeria, which was a different country, in 1914 to forge today’s Nigeria. The old city states of Eddaland still exist with monarchs that have no administrative functions; but serve as social and cultural representatives of different Eddish communities that were once sovereign.

The designation of Afikpo South was given to Eddaland when it was separated from Afikpo Local Government Area in 1991 by the then Nigerian Federal Military Government. Successive legislators from the area have since fought to keep the name of their place, Eddaland as the name of Local Government Area in Nigeria's constitution to better reflect their heritage.

Eddaland is bordered by Unwana to the east; Akaeze to the west, Amasiri to the north, Afikpo to the north-east, Ohafia to the south, Nkporo to the south west, and Erei to the south-east.

Culture
Due to a unique culture that values inclusiveness and integrity, Eddaland has a very serene atmosphere of calm and is so peaceful with so low level crime that even today. There are only few Nigeria police stations/posts in the entire area, yet there are rarely situations where local people there call the police. The pristine natural environment of undulating hills, springs and quiet small lakes and the calm and welcoming traditions of the Edda people casts Eddaland as an ideal untouched rough diamond for development into a future world tourism destination.

Unlike the different tribal peoples of Nigeria that surround them, and the larger Igbo ethnic group, the Edda do not have concept of being indigenous as a basis for membership of their cities, towns and villages. The more general concept in Edda is citizenship, which is about membership of person regardless of places of ancestry, to their community of values and shared norms. Persons are not permanent members of a community in Eddaland are considered as guests, and are generally treated very hospitable. The Edda also highly value idea of integrity very highly and loyalty.

 The local government is administered by an elected Chairman and councillors who are elected from their respective wards within the local government area. The first executive chairman was Chief Sonni Ogbuoji.

Weather, climate and vegetation
There are two distinctive seasons in this area: the rainy and dry seasons. The rainy seasons usually begin in early March and ends in October, to give way for the dry season. The dry season usually begins from October and ends in February. These two seasons are dependent on two prevailing winds-The North East trade wind or Dry Harmattan (also called The Tropical Continental) airmass, laden with dust from the Sahara Desert and the South West trade wind from the south Atlantic Ocean (also called The Tropical Maritime) air mass. Temperatures range from 20 °C to 38 °C during dry season and 16 °C to 28 °C during the rainy season. Average annual rainfall varies from 1750mm to 2250mm. The vegetation here is a parkland, with stunted trees and pockets of woodland and forest consisting of shrubs and large trees. The economy here is generally subsistence with agriculture as the mainstay.

Notable people 

 Sinach - singer, songwriter

See also 
 Amanchor Cave

References

Local Government Areas in Ebonyi State